William Donaldson Clark (28 July 1916 – 27 June 1985) was an English economist and public servant.

Early life 
Clark was born on 28 July 1916, in the Northumbrian town of Haltwhistle, the son of John McClare Clark and Marion Jackson. He was educated at the independent Oundle School and graduated from Oriel College, Oxford with a First Class degree in modern history. Clark attended the University of Chicago in 1938 as a Commonwealth Fellow. During World War II he worked doing public relations for Britain in the United States.

Career 
Clark became the London editor of Encyclopædia Britannica in 1946, a post he left for journalism in 1949. In the early 1950s he became a foreign affairs correspondent for The Observer. He was press secretary to Anthony Eden during the Suez Crisis, but resigned shortly afterwards. In 1968 he said that The Manchester Guardian's anti-Suez leading articles were one of the main reasons why Eden asked for the BBC to be bought under direct control of the Government. 

The first director of the Overseas Development Institute from 1960 to 1968, Clark then joined the World Bank and from 1974 to 1980 was their Vice President in Charge of External Affairs.

Death 
Clark died on the night of 27 June 1985 of liver cancer at his home in Cuxham, Oxfordshire. He was survived by his two brothers Kenneth and Nicholas.

References

External links
 Clarke's papers at the World Bank

1916 births
1985 deaths
20th-century British economists
University of Chicago alumni
Deaths from liver cancer
Deaths from cancer in England
People from Haltwhistle